This list includes sovereign states (list) and states with limited recognition that have declared independence from a predecessor state or an occupying power. Various states have never declared independence throughout their formations and hence aren't included in the list. The list generally does not include duplicated entries for states declaring independence in several stages, with the exception of those states that have been militarily occupied for a significant length of time. Subnational entities are usually not included in the list unless they were independent countries prior to joining a larger country (e.g. Zanzibar, which joined Tanganyika to form Tanzania). Some of these dates of independence might be disputed. Entries in the "events" table are written in the present tense.

Before 19th century

19th century to World War I

Interwar period

Cold War

Post–Cold War era

See also 
 Age of Revolution
 Decolonization
 Human history 
 List of national independence days
 List of sovereign states by date of formation
 List of wars of independence
 Modern era
 Timeline of national flags

Notes

References 

World history
Decolonization
Sovereignty
Self-governance
Modern history
Lists of countries
Political timelines